Graham Armitage (24 April 1936 – 6 March 1999) was an English stage, film and television actor.

Armitage was born in Blackpool in Lancashire, the son of Albert Edward Armitage (1908–1959) and Isabel W. née Bailes (1909–). In 1947 Harvey left the UK with his family, flying to South Africa and eventually settling in Cape Town where he attended Sea Point Boy’s High School and then the Christian Brothers College. In early 1951 Harvey and his family moved to Salisbury, in Southern Rhodesia where he attended Prince Edward School. During 1952 Harvey wrote the entrance exam for late entry to Dartmouth Naval College. Whilst his Maths and Geography results were outstanding he had not studied the same syllabus for English Literature and History so failed to obtain entrance. In 1955 he married Carole Shirley England (1934–2017) at the Anglican Cathedral in Salisbury, Rhodesia. The couple had three children. He graduated from RADA in 1952 following which he made his début in the BBC television play Without The Prince, which was transmitted live. For the next twenty years Armitage regularly appeared on screen, mainly on television. He had roles in such shows as The Saint, The Avengers and made several appearances on The Dick Emery Show. In 1973 Armitage went to South Africa to appear in the Noël Coward revue Cowardy Custard and decided to stay there, becoming a familiar face on local television and stage.

In 1974 Olivia Manning adapted two of Arnold Bennett's works (The Card and The Regent) into an eight part BBC Radio play: Denry - The Adventures Of A Card. Armitage portrayed the eponymous Denry with Ursula O'Leary as the beautiful Countess of Chell. From 1979 to 1985 he portrayed Sherlock Holmes for Springbok Radio. His last appearance was in 1999 as a vicar in the South African family film Alec to the Rescue.

Graham Armitage died in Johannesburg in South Africa in 1999. His ashes were buried in the grounds of Manchester Crematorium in the UK.

Selected filmography

Film

 The Spy Who Came in from the Cold (1965) - Pawson (uncredited)
 The Fiction-Makers (1968) - Carson
 Battle of Britain (1969) - Radar Officer (uncredited)
 The Fifth Day of Peace (1970) - Mark
 The Private Life of Sherlock Holmes (1970) - Wiggins (uncredited)
 Scrooge (1970) - Party Guest (uncredited)
 The Music Lovers (1970) - Prince Balukin
 Games That Lovers Play (1971) - Mr. Adams
 The Devils (1971) - Louis XIII of France
 The Boy Friend (1971) - Michael
 Take Me High (1973) - Boardman
 The New Spartans (1975)
 Spanish Fly (1975) - Perkins
 Zulu Dawn (1979) - Capt. Shepstone (uncredited)
 Game for Vultures (1979) - Harken
 Flashpoint Africa (1980) - Don
 The Gods Must Be Crazy (1980) - The Reverend (voice, uncredited)
 Die Groen Faktor (1984) - William Honiball
 Wie Laaste Lag... (1986) - Heart attack businessman
 Going Bananas (1987) - Gen. Smythe-Paget
 Jane and the Lost City (1987) - Cake Waiter
 Code Name Vengeance (1987) - Forrest (uncredited)
 Diamonds High (1988) - Bank manager
 Merchants of War (1989) - Gordon
 Circles in a Forest (1989) - Commissioner
 That Englishwoman: An Account of the Life of Emily Hobhouse (1990) - Minister
 Oddball Hall (1990) - The Grand Noble Master
 River of Diamonds (1991) - Judge
 Fei zhou he shang (1991) - Auctioneer
 Sweet 'n Short (1991) - Bryce Williams
 Fleshtone (1994) - Dr. Sydney Frye
 Cry, the Beloved Country (1995) - Judge
 Alec to the Rescue (1999) - Vicar (final film role)

Television
 Theatre 625 (1966) - Monsieur Bernard
 The Avengers (1966-1967) - Algernon 'Algy' Wynche / Huggins
 Doctor Who (1967) - Barney
 The Saint (1968) - Carson
 The First Churchills (1969) - Earl of Rochester
 Randall and Hopkirk (1970) - Young Stage Director
 From a Bird's Eye View (1971) - Johnstone
 The Naked Civil Servant (1975) - Mr. Dunsmore
 Open All Hours (1976) - Man from Matlock Mutual Protection Society
 My Old Man

References

Bibliography
 Ross, Robert. The Complete Terry-Thomas. Reynolds & Hearn, 2002.

External links

1936 births
1999 deaths
English male television actors
English male stage actors
English male film actors
People from Blackpool
Alumni of RADA
Alumni of Sea Point High School